Freedom, Ohio is an unincorporated community and township in Portage County. Freedom, Ohio, may also refer to:

 Freedom and Freedom Station, former post offices in Freedom Township, Portage County, Ohio
 Freedom, a community in Stark County that formed the city of Alliance, Ohio
 Freedom, an early name for New Rochester, Wood County, Ohio
 Freedom, early variant name of the unincorporated community of Naomi, Ohio, in Henry County
 Freedom Mills, former post office and early variant name of Naomi, Ohio
 Freedom, a former name for the unincorporated community of Whigville, Ohio, in Noble County